Hockerville, Oklahoma is a ghost town in northern Ottawa County, Oklahoma, United States. The community was located just south of the Kansas-Oklahoma border between Picher to the west and Baxter Springs, Kansas, to the northeast.

Picher-Cardin Public Schools, which was the local school district, closed in 2009. The area was placed into Quapaw Public Schools.

References

Ghost towns in Oklahoma